Danny Robins (born September 1976) is an English comedy writer and performer, broadcaster and journalist.

Career 
Robins began his comedy career as a teenager doing stand-up in his home town of Newcastle upon Tyne, where he was friends with Ross Noble, and later at Bristol University as part of the trio "Club Seals" with Marcus Brigstocke and Dan Tetsell. Club Seals' spoof archaeology programme We Are History (BBC Two, 2000) was followed by an adaptation of their Edinburgh Fringe Show The Museum of Everything for BBC Radio 4. The radio sitcom Rudy's Rare Records was written with Tetsell and Lenny Henry and adapted for the stage in 2014. Other comedy writing credits include That Was Then, This Is Now (2004), Armando Iannucci's Gash (2003) and The Basil Brush Show (2007).

The CBBC comedy Young Dracula, also written with Dan Tetsell, ran for five series between 2006 and 2014. A one-off sitcom episode "Monks" was written by Robins for the sixteenth series of the BBC's Comedy Playhouse in 2014. His Radio 4 sitcom The Cold Swedish Winter (2014) was inspired by meeting his Swedish wife, Eva, in 2005, and his subsequent time spent in the country.

Robins' interest in the supernatural has led to him writing and researching several radio series and podcasts on the subject. He created the podcast Haunted for Panoply in 2017. For BBC Radio 4 and BBC Sounds, he wrote and presented The Battersea Poltergeist (2021), followed by Uncanny later in 2021 and The Witch Farm in 2022. His play 2:22 A Ghost Story starring Lily Allen won Best New Play at the 2022 WhatsOnStage Awards.

References

External links
Official website

English comedy writers
Living people
English male comedians
English male television actors
English male voice actors
Male actors from Newcastle upon Tyne
Alumni of the University of Bristol
1976 births